Kivu District was a district of the Belgian Congo. It was formed from part of Stanleyville District in 1914.

Location

Kivu District was named after Lake Kivu, on the border between the Belgian and German colonies. 
Between 30 June 1900 and 27 July 1901 Jules Alexandre Milz undertook a special mission to delimit the Belgian-German border in Kivu.
The district was created by an arrêté royal of 28 March 1912, which divided the Congo into 22 districts.
A 1912 map shows that the large former Stanleyville District had been broken into a much smaller Stanleyville District and new Lowa, Maniema, Kivu  and Ituri districts.
Kivu District was bordered by German and British colonies to the east, Ituri District to the north, Lowa and Maniema districts to the west and Tanganika-Moero District to the south.

The Kivu District became part of the Orientale Province created in 1913.
By 1926 Lowa District had disappeared, absorbed into the Kivu District and Maniema District, and Kivu now extended further to the west.
With the 1933 reorganization Kivu and Maniema were contained in the new Costermansville Province.
The western part of Kivu had been restored to Maniema, but an area in the northwest had been added, taken from Stanleyville District.
By 1954 Costermansville Province had been renamed Kivu Province, and Kivu District had been split into Sud-Kivu District and Nord-Kivu District

Maps

See also

Districts of the Belgian Congo

References

Sources

Districts of the Belgian Congo
Districts of Orientale Province
Districts of Kivu Province